El Aioun Sidi Mellouk or El Aioun is a city in Taourirt Province, Oriental, Morocco. According to the 2004 census, it has a population of 34,767.
It contains several schools including Lycee Ezzayotune, Ecole Mohamed Belkhayyat and Ecole Route de Jirada in the southeast of the town. College Sidi Makhoukh is located to the northeast, opposite the souk. It also has a hospital, Centre de Sante.

References

Populated places in Taourirt Province
Municipalities of Morocco